Cyperus sphaerolepis is a species of sedge that is found across northern Central America and the southern United States.

The species was first formally described by the botanist Johann Otto Boeckeler in 1868.

See also 
 List of Cyperus species

References 

sphaerolepis
Taxa named by Johann Otto Boeckeler
Plants described in 1868
Flora of Texas
Flora of Arizona
Flora of New Mexico
Flora of Mexico
Flora of Guatemala